Chymotrypsinogen is an inactive precursor (zymogen) of chymotrypsin, a digestive enzyme which breaks proteins down into smaller peptides. Chymotrypsinogen is a single polypeptide chain consisting of 245 amino acid residues. It is synthesized in the acinar cells of the pancreas and stored inside membrane-bounded granules at the apex of the acinar cell. Release of the granules from the cell is stimulated by either a hormonal signal or a nerve impulse, and the granules spill into a duct leading into the duodenum.

Activation 
Chymotrypsinogen must be inactive until it gets to the digestive tract. This prevents damage to the pancreas or any other organs. It is activated into its active form by another enzyme called trypsin. This active form is called π-chymotrypsin and is used to create α-chymotrypsin. Trypsin cleaves the peptide bond in chymotrypsinogen between arginine-15 and isoleucine-16. This creates two peptides within the π-chymotrypsin molecule, held together by a disulfide bond. One of the π-chymotrypsins acts on another by breaking a leucine and serine peptide bond. The activated π-chymotrypsin reacts with other π-chymotrypsin molecules to cleave out two dipeptides, which are, serine-14–arginine-15 and threonine-147–asparagine-148.  This reaction yields the α-chymotrypsin. The yield of α-chymotrypsin can be affected by inhibitors such as hydrocinnate and also by pH, temperature and calcium chloride.

The activation process can be studied using fluorescence probe 2-p-toluidinylnaphthalene-6-sulfonate (TNS). TNS forms covalent bonds with chymotrypsinogen and as the bonds break to form chymotrypsin in the presence of trypsin the fluorescence increases.

References

Enzymes
Zymogens